The Penn–Liberty Historic District is a historic district in the downtown Pittsburgh, Pennsylvania, United States.  The district was listed on the National Register of Historic Places on November 18, 1987.

References

Historic districts on the National Register of Historic Places in Pennsylvania
Historic districts in Pittsburgh
Italianate architecture in Pennsylvania
Queen Anne architecture in Pennsylvania
City of Pittsburgh historic designations
National Register of Historic Places in Pittsburgh